Okulovskaya is a rural locality (a village) in Nizhneslobodskoye Rural Settlement, Vozhegodsky District, Vologda Oblast, Russia. The population was 68 as of 2002.

Geography 
The distance to Vozhega is 50.5 km, to Derevenka is 1.5 km. Derevenka, Chernovskaya, Fedyuninskaya, Kholdynka, Zasukhonskaya are the nearest rural localities.

References 

Rural localities in Vozhegodsky District